American pop singer-songwriter Kelly Clarkson has released nine studio albums, seven extended plays, one compilation album, one remix album, and 49 singles (including six as a featured artist). In 2002, she won the inaugural season of the television competition American Idol and was immediately signed to a recording deal with 19 Recordings, S Records, and RCA Records. She made her chart debut in September 2002 with the double A-side single "Before Your Love"/"A Moment Like This", latter of which topped the Billboard Hot 100 chart and eventually became the year's best-selling single in the United States. Her debut album, Thankful, was released in April 2003 and entered the US Billboard 200 chart at number one. Thankful  produced the hit lead single "Miss Independent" and was certified double-platinum by the Recording Industry Association of America (RIAA).

Released in 2004, Clarkson's second studio album Breakaway expanded her audience to international markets and currently remains as her most successful album to date with sales of 12 million copies worldwide. Aided by the commercial successes of its worldwide hit singles "Since U Been Gone", "Behind These Hazel Eyes", "Because of You", "Walk Away", and "Breakaway", Breakaway topped the Irish Albums Chart and the Dutch Album Top 100 chart and became the world's seventh best-selling album of 2005, according to the International Federation of the Phonographic Industry (IFPI). Clarkson released her third studio album My December in 2007 amidst a highly-publicized dispute with music mogul Clive Davis. Though its commercial performance paled in comparison to its predecessor's, it spawned the hit single "Never Again" and was eventually certified platinum by the RIAA. In 2009, she released her fourth studio album All I Ever Wanted, which became her second number one entry on Billboard 200 chart. Its lead single "My Life Would Suck Without You" currently maintains the record of the biggest jump to number one in the history of the Billboard Hot 100 chart, and was followed by the hit singles "I Do Not Hook Up" and "Already Gone".

In 2011, Clarkson released her fifth studio album Stronger, accompanied by the hit singles "Mr. Know It All" and "Stronger (What Doesn't Kill You)". Stronger was certified platinum by the RIAA, fueled by the success of "Stronger (What Doesn't Kill You)", which currently stands as her most successful single with number one peak positions on sixteen Billboard charts, including the Billboard Hot 100 chart. In 2012, Clarkson commemorated her tenth career anniversary with her first greatest hits compilation, Greatest Hits – Chapter One. Accompanied by its hit lead single "Catch My Breath", Chapter One was certified gold by the RIAA. Released in 2013, her sixth studio album and first Christmas record Wrapped in Red became that year's best-selling holiday album in the United States. Its lead single "Underneath the Tree" recurrently charts as a popular Christmas hit song every holiday season since its release.

Clarkson completed her recording contract with 19 and RCA with the release of her seventh studio album Piece by Piece in 2015. Certified gold by the RIAA, it became her third number one album on Billboard 200 chart and produced the hit singles "Heartbeat Song" and "Piece by Piece", the latter of which celebrated her milestone 100th number one listing on the Billboard charts. A year later, she signed a long-term recording contract with Atlantic Records. Her first record on the label and her eighth studio album Meaning of Life was released in 2017 and produced the hit single "Love So Soft". This was followed by her second Christmas album, When Christmas Comes Around... in 2021, accompanied by the single "Christmas Isn't Canceled (Just You)". To date, Clarkson has sold over 28 million albums and 54 million singles worldwide. In the United States, she has accumulated over 100 Billboard chart number ones; and has sold over 18.6 million album-equivalent units (including 14.6 million in traditional album sales), 35 million digital tracks, 61 billion in cumulative radio audience, and 2.8 billion on-demand streams.

Albums

Studio albums

Compilation albums

Remix albums

Extended plays

Singles

As lead artist

As a featured artist

Promotional singles

Other charted songs

Other appearances

Songwriting credits

See also
 Kelly Clarkson videography

References

Notes

Bibliography

Citations

External links
 
 

American Idol discographies
Discographies of American artists
Discography
Pop music discographies